Karshi Airport  is an airport in south eastern Uzbekistan, south-west of Karshi.

Airlines and destinations

See also
 Karshi-Khanabad Air Base
 List of the busiest airports in the former USSR
 Transportation in Uzbekistan

References

External links
 

Airports in Uzbekistan
Qashqadaryo Region